Frostad is a surname. Notable people with the surname include:

Emerson Frostad (born 1983), Canadian former baseball catcher
Knut Frostad (born 1967), Norwegian yachtsman
Lawrence Frostad (born 1967), American former competition swimmer
Mark Frostad (born 1949), Canadian thoroughbred horse trainer